The National Insurance Act 1946 (c 67) was a British Act of Parliament passed during the Attlee ministry which established a comprehensive system of social security throughout the United Kingdom.

The act meant that all who were of working age were to pay a weekly contribution. If they had been paying National Insurance, mothers were to be entitled to an allowance (of 18 weeks) for each child as well as a lump sum when the child was born.  The act however excluded married women. The weekly contributions meant that benefits including sickness benefit and unemployment benefits were able to be offered. Pensions were to offered to men and women at ages 60 and 65 respectively.

Background 
Attlee had campaigned hard in his campaign leading up to the 1945 election for the creation of the welfare state. When elected, he and his administration and adopted Beveridge proposal from 1944 to keep to his manifesto promise.

Significance
According to the historian Kenneth O. Morgan, the Act constituted "a measure which provided a comprehensive universal basis for insurance provision that had hitherto been unknown".

See also
UK labour law
Welfare state
National Insurance Act 1911
National Insurance Act 1965 (c 51)
Social Security Contributions and Benefits Act 1992
Timeline of pensions in the United Kingdom

References

External links
Hansard

United Kingdom Acts of Parliament 1946
Social security in the United Kingdom
National Insurance